Banjee (as in: "banjee boy" or "banjee girl") is a term originating in the house system and ball culture of New York City which seem to be "from the hood" or embodying an urban, tough swagger. The term is mostly associated with New York City and may be Nuyorican in origin. Attitude, clothing, ethnicity, masculinity, physique, and youth are all elements of what has been called "banjee realness".

History 

According to The Village Voice, "banjee boy categories have been a part of vogue balls since at least the early 1980s". The 1990 documentary film Paris Is Burning featured "banjee realness" as one of the categories in which contestants competed for trophies.

Of his experience with the term, a gay black man writes:

The word banjee never entered mainstream pop culture, but it had currency as gay slang throughout the 1990s. In 1997, author Emanuel Xavier coined and referenced the term in his debut poetry collection, "Pier Queen".  In 1998, a report in the medical journal AIDS Patient Care and STDs regarding safer sex practices among young Black and Latino men was entitled "Banjee Boys Are Down" (down, in this vernacular, meaning "supportive of it"), named for a project of Brooklyn's Unity Fellowship Church to get safer sex information to young men of color.

The 1999 play Banjee, written by playwright A.B. Lugo, presented at the Milagro Theater/Clemente Soto Vélez Cultural and Educational Center (and in another NYC venue in 2004), is "the story of Angel (played by Indio Meléndez), a straight homeboy, and Tony (played by Will Sierra), an admittedly bi banjee, who've known each other since childhood".

The term banjee has also been used by several producers of gay pornography in presenting the type of young man described herein. For example, in 1995 a company called Pleasure Productions produced a DVD called Banjee Black Boys (and five similarly named sequels) and  a company called Banjee Boy, Inc. produced films with taglines such as "Wanna see some of the sexiest, thugged out gangstas that NY has to offer?". There are other examples from adult films, as well as several pornographic websites (such as "Banjee Boy Group Slam") that still use the term.

While seeming to have peaked in popularity during the 1990s, the term banjee is still in use. For example, a 2003 web page for a restaurant in East Harlem describes its clientele as an "eclectic mix of patrons that range from pretty neighborhood Banjee boys to some of the wise guys that once populated the space formerly." In 2008, the band Hercules & Love Affair has performed wearing matching shirts with the word printed on them. In the 2000s and 2010s, New York clothing label Hood By Air's designer Shayne Oliver used banjee culture as a general point of reference and an LGBTQ+ clubnight in London in 2013, featuring a DJ named Borja Peña, called itself "Borja's Banjee Mix", referencing black masculinity. Looking backwards, the 2018 period drama Pose, set in 1987's New York City Ball scene, has characters walk for the category "realness, bring it like a banjee boy" in episode 1x06 "Love is the Message", written by Ryan Murphy and Janet Mock.

Related terms 
Homo thug is a more recent and more popular term which is nearly synonymous with banjee. However, homo thug does imply that the man in question is primarily homosexual. In contrast, a banjee might be bisexual or only have opportunistic homosexual sex with men when women are unavailable—a theme in many of the pornographic films mentioned above.

Gayngsta, a portmanteau derived from gay and gangsta, is another recent coinage. It has mostly been used in relation to the underground LGBT hip hop scene as shown in the documentary Pick Up the Mic and featured in the "Homorevolution Tour 2007" with these artists. While easily discernible in writing, pronunciation is barely discernible from gangsta.

Banjee girl is heard so rarely that it is difficult to define. In discussing a fashion show in Paris, one reviewer wrote in 2005:

Several examples of the use of the term banjee girl exist in the blogosphere but it has rarely, if ever, made it into print or mass media. Exceptions include RuPaul's Billboard charting single "Back to My Roots", which includes the term in a list of hair fashions, an episode of the 2014 season of RuPaul's Drag Race and Sharaya J, whose 2013 debut single was called "BANJI"; she also used the name for her production company when she split from Missy Elliott's label The Goldmind Inc. in 2016.

In the 1990 documentary film Paris is Burning, banjee girl and banjee boy were used in comparable frequency. Coupled with the film's focus on the ball culture, an inextricably-connected transgender and drag subculture of 1980s New York City, this lends itself to a contextual definition of those performers impersonating females and attempting to exhibit the ultimately judged quality of holistic visual verisimilitude—"realness".

See also 
 African-American culture and sexual orientation
 Down-low (sexual slang)
 Vanessa Vanjie Mateo

References 
Notes

Citations

Gay masculinity
1980s neologisms
LGBT culture in the United States
Sexual slang
LGBT terminology
Ball culture
Culture of New York City
Sexual orientation
LGBT Hispanic and Latino American culture
LGBT African-American culture
Male homosexuality